Notre Dame of Kalamasig is a private and Catholic educational institution in Kalamansig, Sultan Kudarat, Philippines. Established in 1948, it offers a secondary education program.

References

Notre Dame Educational Association
Catholic secondary schools in the Philippines
Schools in Sultan Kudarat